Elements of International Law, first published in 1836, is a book on international law by Henry Wheaton which has long been influential.

Contents

Textual history 
Many translations, editions and reprints of Wheaton's Elements have appeared since its first publication. The third edition was published in Philadelphia in 1845. At the request of Wheaton's family, the sixth edition, with the last corrections of the author and a biographical notice, was published by William Beach Lawrence (Boston, 1855). Lawrence also published the seventh edition (1863). The eight edition was published, with new notes and a new biography, by Richard Henry Dana, Jr. (Boston, 1866). Dana's alleged use of Lawrence's notes from the previous editions resulted in a protracted legal controversy.

A French translation was published in Leipzig and Paris in 1848. At the insistence of Anson Burlingame, U.S. minister to China, Wheaton's book was translated into Chinese and published at the expense of the imperial government (4 vols., Pekin, 1865). The translator was American Protestant missionary William Alexander Parsons Martin who was working in China at that time.
The book was also translated into Japanese and the language of each country of Asia.

The original edition bore the title Elements of International Law with a Sketch of the History of the Subject. Some subsequent editions omitted the "Sketch," which in 1845 became (in expanded form) part of Wheaton's History of the Law of Nations in Europe and America.

Influence 

The translations had a large influence on the approval of modern international law in Asia. Wheaton's was the first book to introduce international law to East Asia in full scale.
In listing Henry Wheaton among "prominent jurists of the nineteenth century," Antony Anghie comments on the "several editions" of Elements of International Law and on the work as "widely respected and used at this time."

References 

International law
History of East Asia
Law books
1830s books
History of diplomacy